Jay Sexter  is an American educator who is known for having been the president of Mercy College and for his work in developing and expanding the scope of the Touro College of Osteopathic Medicine of which he is the retired provost, CEO and vice president for academic affairs.   A library at the Henderson, Nevada location of the aforementioned institution has been named in his honor as has a lecture hall at another of its locations in Middletown, New York.   He currently serves as a member of the board of directors, and is the executive vice president of American Collegiate Acquisitions, Inc.

Early life and education
Sexter grew up in Sea Gate, Brooklyn, New York. He completed his undergraduate education at the City College of New York. Sexter then attended Hunter College where he received his master's degree in social studies education. He then completed a second master's degree at the University of Southern California in counseling psychology. Upon graduating from the University of Southern California, Sexter completed his doctorate in educational psychology at Fordham University.

Career
While at Fordham University, Sexter became the youngest school district superintendent in New York State. He was a teacher, guidance counselor, and principal. Sexter continued in the educational field and worked as an assistant professor at Fordham University in 1972. He remained at Fordham University until 1985. Throughout his 13 years at Fordham University, Sexter received several promotions. He was promoted to a department chairperson, dean, assistant vice-president, and an associate vice-president for academic affairs.

In 1985, Sexter transplanted to the John Jay College of Criminal Justice. Over the course of five years, Sexter served as the chief academic officer, provost, and academic vice-president. He engaged in a variety of research related to criminal justice, and doubled the grant funding for research in this field, while working at John Jay. He became more prominent in the realm of higher education, and traveled to several countries, such as Japan, Korea, and China, to lecture on law enforcement personnel.

In 1990, Sexter became president of Mercy College. Within a nine-year term, Sexter increased the student population at Mercy College from 4,800 to over 12,000.  Additionally, he worked to develop several medical programs and dramatically increased the college's endowment. He retired in 1999 and became the first President Emeritus of Mercy College.

After his retirement, Sexter received a phone call from Dr. Bernard Lander, the founder and president of Touro College requesting his help in the development of a medical school in California. Sexter agreed to help in this endeavor and moved to Vallejo, California in 2000. While living on campus for a year, Sexter expanded the Osteopathic Medical School and created six additional programs in California. Some of the new programs that Sexter created included Physical Therapy, Pharmacy, and Physical Assistant Programs. In 2001, Sexter went to Nevada and chose  property for Touro College to build its new campus. Sexter was essential to this campus’ development. He designed the campus, supervised its construction, and obtained approval for the School of Osteopathic Medicine, Nursing, Education, Physical Therapy, and Occupational Therapy. He then left to return to New York, where he initiated another Touro campus. Sexter has worked as the CEO of the medical school campus in Central Harlem, and then opened  another campus in Middletown, New York. He retired at the end of the 2015 academic year, and continues to serve as a consultant for the osteopathic schools in New York, Vallejo, and Henderson Nevada.

Sexter is presently involved in a number of real estate investments.

Personal life
Sexter currently lives in Boynton Beach, Florida with his wife, Eva Spinelli Sexter. Together, Sexter and his wife have five children and five grand children.

References

Living people
21st-century American psychologists
Heads of universities and colleges in the United States
People from Coney Island
City College of New York alumni
Fordham University alumni
Mercy College (New York) faculty
Year of birth missing (living people)
Touro College people